Sangam Jagarlamudi is a village in Guntur district of the Indian state of Andhra Pradesh. It is located in Tenali mandal of Tenali revenue division. It forms a part of Andhra Pradesh Capital Region.

Geography 
The Buckingham Canal and the Tungabhadra drain confluence near the village. The summer storage tank at the village supplies water to Guntur Municipal Corporation.

Demographics 

 census, Sangam Jagarlamudi had a population of 5,447. The total population constitute, 2,679 males and 2,768 females —a sex ratio of 1033 females per 1000 males. 482 children are in the age group of 0–6 years, of which 243 are boys and 239 are girls. The average literacy rate stands at 62.62% with 3,709 literates, significantly higher than the state average of 67.41%.

Government and politics 

Sangam Jagarlamudigram panchayat is the local self-government of the village. There are 14 wards, each represented by an elected ward member. The present sarpanch is vacant, elected indirectly by the ward members. The village is administered by the  Tenali Mandal Parishad at the intermediate level of panchayat raj institutions.

Culture 
Sangam Jagarlamudi temple of Lord Shiva is a Hindu pilgrimage site and draws many pilgrims during the festival of Maha Shivaratri.

Transport 

Tenali–Narakodur road passes through Sangam Jagarlamudi. Rural road connects the village with Selapadu. On this route, APSRTC operates buses from Guntur and Tenali bus stations. Sangam Jagarlamudi railway station provides rail connectivity and is situated on Guntur–Tenali section of Guntur railway division.

Education 

As per the school information report for the academic year 2018–19, the village has a total of 7 schools. These include one private and 6 Zilla/Mandal Parishad schools. Sangam Jagarlamudi Zilla Parishad High School is a district council funded school, which provides secondary education in the village.

See also 
List of villages in Guntur district

References

External links 

Villages in Guntur district